Cham has the oldest literary history of any Austronesian language. The Dong Yen Chau inscription, written in Old Cham, dates from the late 4th century AD.

References 
Languages attested from the 4th century
Austronesian languages
vi:Tiếng Chăm cổ